Fiegel is a surname. Notable people with the surname include:

 Frank "Rocky" Fiegel (1868–1947), American bartender and laborer, reputed to be the real-life inspiration for Popeye
 Michael Fiegel, American writer and game designer
 Joshua Fiegel, American Businessman